The 1959 Toronto Argonauts finished in fourth place in the Interprovincial Rugby Football Union with a 4–10 record and failed to make the playoffs.

Preseason

The Argonauts hosted an interleague exhibition game on August 5 against the NFL's Chicago Cardinals in the inaugural game at the new Exhibition Stadium.  The game was the first to involve an NFL team played in Toronto.  It was also the first NFL-CFL interleague exhibition match held since the establishment of the Canadian Football League in 1958.  The Argos lost 55–26.

Schedule

Regular season

Standings

Schedule

References

Toronto Argonauts seasons
1959 Canadian Football League season by team